Innertkirchen Grimseltor railway station, formerly Innertkirchen Post, is a railway station in the municipality of Innertkirchen, in the Swiss canton of Bern. It is located on the  Meiringen–Innertkirchen line of the Meiringen-Innertkirchen-Bahn (MIB).

Services 
 the following services stop at Innertkirchen Grimseltor:

References

External links 
 

Railway stations in the canton of Bern
Meiringen-Innertkirchen-Bahn stations